The Sweden Cup may refer to:

Copa Suecia, Argentine football tournament held 1958-1960
Svenska Cupen, Swedish football tournament